The 2014 Chicago Fire season was the club's 19th year of existence, as well as their 17th season in Major League Soccer and their 17th consecutive year in the top-flight of American soccer.

Chicago Fire began the regular season on March 9, 2014, with an away match against Chivas USA. The Men in Red concluded the regular season on October 24, 2014, with a home match against Houston Dynamo. Chicago finished the season with a 6-10-18 record and missed the playoffs for the fourth time in the past five seasons. With 18 drawn matches, the Fire set a new MLS record for most ties in a season, beating the previous record of 16 ties set in 2011 by Chicago Fire and New York Red Bulls.

After 12 years with the team, midfielder Logan Pause retired at the end of the season. Pause spent all of his professional career playing for Chicago Fire. On November 3, 2014, he was named Vice President of the Chicago Fire Soccer Club.

Squad at the end of the season 
As of October 24, 2014. Source: Chicago Fire official roster

Player movement

In 

Per Major League Soccer and club policies terms of the deals do not get disclosed.

Out 

 Players selected in the 2014 MLS SuperDraft, but ultimately not signed by the club: midfielder Zach Bolden (selected 61st overall, fourth round, from University of Denver), midfielder Kadeem Dacres (selected 65th overall, fourth round, from University of Maryland, Baltimore County) and midfielder Bryan Ciesulka (selected 75th overall, fourth round, from Marquette University).
 Trialists released in the preseason: defender Rafael Alves, forward Vini Dantas, goalkeeper Kyle Renfro, defender Andrae Campbell, forward Daniel Jackson, midfielder Freddie Braun (winner of the Open Tryout), defender Tim Ward goalkeeper David Meves defender Parker Walsh and forward Grant Ward.

Loans

In

Out 
Per Major League Soccer and club policies terms of the deals do not get disclosed.

Technical staff

Standings

Conference tables 

Eastern Conference

Western Conference

Overall table

Results summary

Results

Match results

Preseason 
Kickoff times are in CST (UTC-06)

Major League Soccer 

Kickoff times are in CDT (UTC-05)

U.S. Open Cup 

Kickoff times are in CDT (UTC-05)

Friendlies 
Kickoff times are in CDT (UTC-05)

Statistics

Appearances and goals

|-
|colspan="14"|Players who left the club during the season: (Statistics shown are the appearances made and goals scored while at Chicago Fire)

Leading scorers

Updated to match played on October 24, 2014.Source: MLSsoccer.com statistics - 2014 Chicago Fire

Recognition

MLS Player of the Week

MLS Team of the Week

Team annual awards 
Forward Quincy Amarikwa won the Golden Boot award for scoring the team-leading eight goals this season.  Goalkeeper Sean Johnson was named the Defensive Player of the Year for the second year in a row.  Johnson was also named the team's Most Valuable Player.  The winners were selected by the local media members.

First-year defender Lovel Palmer was voted Section 8 Chicago Supporters Player of the Year.

Patrick Nyarko's strike in the match against New York Red Bulls on May 10 was voted the team's 2014 Goal of the Year.

Kits

Primary kit 
The club unveiled its new 2014 primary kit on March 4, 2014.  According to the release, the jersey design was inspired by the City of Chicago fire trucks which feature a dark top, a band and red throughout the bottom half.  The light blue represents the primary color of the Chicago flag.

Third kit 
On October 8, 2013 the club unveiled the third kit to be worn in the 2014 season. The municipal-themed design named "Heart on Your Sleeve" incorporated the city flag as well as the iconic Chicago skyline. The winning design was selected via a fan vote online.

Miscellany

Draft pick trades 
Picks acquired:
 2014 MLS SuperDraft 13th overall pick, Jhon Kennedy Hurtado and Patrick Ianni from Seattle Sounders FC in exchange for Jalil Anibaba
 2014 MLS SuperDraft fourth round pick from Real Salt Lake in exchange for Kwame Watson-Siriboe
 2014 MLS SuperDraft fourth round pick from Columbus Crew in exchange for Daniel Paladini

Picks traded:
 2014 MLS SuperDraft second round pick and allocation money to Philadelphia Union in exchange for defender Bakary Soumaré
 2014 MLS SuperDraft third round pick to Toronto FC in exchange for Quincy Amarikwa
 2014 MLS SuperDraft 8th overall pick, a 2015 MLS SuperDraft conditional third round pick and Jalil Anibaba to Seattle Sounders FC in exchange for Jhon Kennedy Hurtado and Patrick Ianni
 2016 MLS SuperDraft conditional pick to Los Angeles Galaxy in exchange for Greg Cochrane

References

External links

Chicago Fire FC seasons
Chicago Fire Soccer Club
Chicago Fire Soccer Club
Chicago Fire